ʿAbd-Allāh ibn Jaḥsh ( 586 – 625), was the brother-in-law and companion of the Islamic prophet, Muhammad.

Description
He was described as being "neither tall nor short and had a lot of hair."

Family
He was the son of Jahsh ibn Riyab, an immigrant to Mecca from the Asadi tribe, and Umayma bint Abd al-Muttalib, a member of the Hashimi clan of the Qurayshi tribe. One of his sisters was Zaynab bint Jahsh, a wife of Muhammad. The family had formed an alliance with Harb ibn Umayyah and his son Abu Sufyan.

He married Fatima bint Abi Hubaysh, who was a cousin of Khadijah from the Asadi clan of the Quraysh, and they had one son, Muhammad.

Conversion to Islam
Abd-Allah ibn Jahsh converted to Islam under the influence of Abu Bakr. He joined other Muslims in the second emigration to Abyssinia in 616. He returned to Mecca in late 619, and was one of the first to emigrate to Medina in 622.

Battles

Muhammad dispatched ibn Jahsh on the Nakhla Raid in Rajab A.H. 2 (October 623), together with seven other Emigrants and six camels. Muhammad gave Abd-Allah a letter, with instructions not to read it until he had travelled for two days, but then to follow its instructions without putting pressure on his companions. After Abd-Allah had proceeded for two days, he duly opened the letter; it told him to proceed until he reached Nakhlah, between Mecca and Ta'if in the Hejazi region, lie in wait for the Quraysh and observe what they were doing. When the Quraysh caravan passed through Nakhlah, Abd-Allah urged his companions to attack the merchants despite the fact that it was still the sacred month of Rajab, when fighting was forbidden. In the battle, one of the Qurayshi merchants was killed and two others were captured, along with all the merchandise. At first Muhammad disapproved Abd-Allah's actions, saying, "I did not instruct you to fight in the sacred month." But later he announced a new revelation:

Later Abd-Allah was among those who fought at the Battle of Badr.
He also participated in Battle of Uhad. And died (Shaheed) in the battle.

Death
Abd-Allah ibn Jahsh was killed in the battle of Uhud by Akhnas ibn Shurayq. According to his family, his opponents mutilated his corpse by cutting off his nose and ears.

Notelist

References

External links
 Restatement  (Ahlul Bayt Digital Islamic Library Project)

586 births
625 deaths
Companions of the Prophet
Family of Muhammad